"I Got It Honest" is a song co-written and recorded by American country music singer Aaron Tippin. It was released in September 1994 as the lead single from the album, Lookin' Back at Myself. The song reached number 15 on the U.S. Billboard Hot Country Singles & Tracks chart and peaked at number 9 on the Canadian RPM Country Tracks chart. It was written by Tippin, Marcus Franklin Johnson, and Bruce Burch.

Music video
The music video premiered in late 1994.

Chart performance

References

1994 singles
1994 songs
Aaron Tippin songs
Songs written by Aaron Tippin
RCA Records singles
Songs written by Bruce Burch